Parliament House, on the corner of North Terrace and King William Road in the Adelaide city centre, is the seat of the Parliament of South Australia. It was built to replace the adjacent and overcrowded Parliament House, now referred to as "Old Parliament House".  Due to financial constraints, the current Parliament House was constructed in stages over 65 years from 1874 to 1939.

Guided public tours of the building are held on weekdays at 10am and 2pm, except when the Parliament is sitting.

"Old" Parliament House

The Parliament of South Australia began in 1857, when the colony of South Australia was granted self-government.

Old Parliament House on North Terrace is situated to the west of the new Parliament House, and is associated with numerous and progressive legislative reforms in which South Australia led the way (such as the introduction of full adult male suffrage in 1856, and women's suffrage women's suffrage in 1894). The building, designed over many stages, incorporates the work of three important colonial architects: William Bennett Hays; Edward Angus Hamilton (both of whom held the office of Colonial Architect of South Australia); and Edward John Woods. Originally built as a single room brick chamber in 1843, the building was then extended in 1857 to accommodate the new bicameral Parliament.

It is one of only a few buildings constructed before 1860 remaining in Adelaide.

Renewal
Following the completion of the new Parliament House in 1939, Premier Thomas Playford proposed that the old complex be demolished. It was saved by the onset of the Second World War and its use as a Royal Australian Air Force recruiting office. Thereafter it was used by government departments.

Further modifications and alterations continued through to the 1970s, but by the mid-1970s the complex was sadly run down and neglected. In the late 1970s it was converted to the "Constitutional Museum" and was restored to reflect its 1875 condition. Under the direction of the newly-created History Trust of South Australia, the museum (Australia’s first political museum) operated under that name from 1979, and then as "Old Parliament House" until 1995. The building then reverted to use by the parliament, largely as offices and committee rooms.

"New" Parliament House

Construction

In 1872 legislation increased the House of Assembly by 10 members, effective from 1875, reflecting the increased colonial population. It was decided that a completely new building was needed for the expanding parliament. A commission, appointed by the Governor of South Australia, was set up in 1874 to adjudicate a design competition for the new building that would form the basis of ‘New’ Parliament House. A design by prominent Adelaide architect Edmund Wright and his partner Lloyd Taylor was selected as the winner. This Greek Revival design featured ornate columns of the Corinthian order, impressive towers, and a grand dome. 

Parliament House was built with Kapunda marble and West Island granite. Construction began on the West Wing in 1874 and was completed in 1889 at a cost of £165,404. However, lack of funds resulted in the towers and dome being removed from the design that was implemented. The West Wing contained the new chamber for the South Australian House of Assembly and associated offices. The South Australian Legislative Council continued in the Old Parliament House next door. Economic depression in the 1890s delayed the completion of Parliament House, and it was not until 1913 that plans were sketched for the East Wing. The outbreak of the Great War again delayed construction.

Completion

The project was taken up again in the 1930s following a £100,000 gift by Sir John Langdon Bonython, who sent a cheque to the State Premier with a note indicating the money should be used to complete the half finished Parliament house on North Terrace. The project also functioned as a job generation scheme to alleviate the mass unemployment of the Great Depression. Work began on the East Wing in 1936, the year of South Australia's centenary, and was completed three years later in 1939 at a cost of £241,887.

When finally completed, the British Houses Of Parliament were so delighted the building was completed after such a long time they organized to have the Lion forming part of a Royal Coat of Arms at the Westminster Houses Of Parliament removed from the stonework and shipped to Adelaide. It was presented to The Parliament Of South Australia by The Empire Parliamentary Association United Kingdom in 1939. The statue and plaque are located in a setting at the front of the building. The completed Parliament House was formally opened on 5 June 1939 by Lord Gowrie, the 10th Governor-General of Australia, (and also a former Governor of South Australia). Since that time, occasional plans to complete the building by constructing the towers and dome are revived, but none of them has ever been implemented.

Gallery

References

Further reading

 
Parliament of South Australia: Parliament House

External links

Parliament of South Australia

Buildings and structures in Adelaide

Legislative buildings in Australia
Tourist attractions in Adelaide
Australian National Heritage List
Neoclassical architecture in Australia
1939 establishments in Australia
South Australian Heritage Register
Government buildings completed in 1874
Government buildings completed in 1939
Government buildings in South Australia
Adelaide Park Lands